Wing is a rural small town in Burleigh County, North Dakota, United States. It is part of the "Bismarck, ND Metropolitan Statistical Area" or "Bismarck-Mandan". The population was 132 at the 2020 census.  As of 2010, the town has a post office, a full service station, a bar, a restaurant, a small (10-unit) apartment complex, a senior's center, a hotel, several churches, and a complete (K-12) public school system.

History
Wing was founded in 1911. It was named for Charles K. Wing, who platted the area.

Geography
Wing is located at  (47.140938, -100.280626).

Demographics

2010 census
As of the census of 2010, there were 152 people, 66 households, and 41 families living in the city. The racial makup of the city was 94.1% White, 2.6% Native American, and 3.3% from two or more races. Hispanic or Latino of any race were 0.7%.

Of the 66 households 24.2% had children under the age of 18 living with them, 50.0% were married couples living together, 7.6% had a female householder with no husband present, 4.5% had a male householder with no wife present, and 37.9% were non-families. 31.8% of households were one person and 12.1% were one person aged 65 or older. The average household size was 2.30 and the average family size was 2.98.

The median age was 45.5 years. 26.3% of residents were under the age of 18; 3.3% were between the ages of 18 and 24; 19.8% were from 25 to 44; 31.6% were from 45 to 64; and 19.1% were 65 or older. The gender makeup of the city was 52.0% male and 48.0% female.

2000 census
As of the census of 2000, there were 124 people, 68 households, and 32 families living in the city. The population density was 210.3 people per square mile (81.1/km). There were 89 housing units at an average density of 150.9 per square mile (58.2/km). The racial makup of the city was 99.19% White, and 0.81% from two or more races. 51.3% were of German, 16.8% Norwegian, 7.6% Scandinavian and 5.0% Finnish ancestry.

Of the 68 households 14.7% had children under the age of 18 living with them, 44.1% were married couples living together, 2.9% had a female householder with no husband present, and 51.5% were non-families. 48.5% of households were one person and 30.9% were one person aged 65 or older. The average household size was 1.82 and the average family size was 2.64.

The age distribution was 13.7% under the age of 18, 4.0% from 18 to 24, 16.9% from 25 to 44, 32.3% from 45 to 64, and 33.1% 65 or older. The median age was 53 years. For every 100 females, there were 90.8 males. For every 100 females age 18 and over, there were 87.7 males.

The median household income was $14,688 and the median income for a family was $44,167. Males had a median income of $26,750 versus $23,438 for females. The per capita income for the city was $14,970. There were 10.5% of families and 19.7% of the population living below the poverty line, including 20.0% of under eighteens and 35.7% of those over 64.

Points of interests
Southeast of Wing, at 47°2'48"N   100°5'49"W, there is the only point in the Western hemisphere, where two HVDC overhead powerlines, CU and Square Butte cross each other.

Education
Wing School District is the school system.

References

Cities in Burleigh County, North Dakota
Cities in North Dakota
Populated places established in 1911
1911 establishments in North Dakota